Khera Kalan railway station is a small railway station in Khera Kalan which is a residential and commercial neighborhood of the North Delhi district of Delhi. Its code is KHKN. The station is part of Delhi Suburban Railway. The station consists of two platforms, neither well sheltered. It lacks many facilities including Water and Sanitation.

Trains 

 Delhi Panipat Passenger
 Delhi Kalka Passenger (unreserved)
 Delhi Panipat Passenger
 Ghaziabad Panipat MEMU
 Kurukshetra - Old Delhi MEMU
 Kurukshetra Delhi MEMU
 Kurukshetra Hazrat Nizamuddin MEMU

See also

 Hazrat Nizamuddin railway station
 New Delhi Railway Station
 Delhi Junction Railway station
 Anand Vihar Railway Terminal
 Sarai Rohilla Railway Station
 Delhi Metro

References 

Railway stations in North Delhi district
Delhi railway division
Transport in Delhi